Huey Long (April 25, 1904 – June 10, 2009) was an American jazz and R&B guitarist and singer and band leader who was a member of the quartet  The Ink Spots. Long's career began in the 1919 as a banjoist before moving to guitar. He became a member of the Ink Spots in 1945 and participated in spinoff bands in the 1960s.

Career
Born in Sealy, Texas, Long began his musical career in 1919 playing banjo for Frank Davis' Louisiana Jazz Band Houston. He switched from banjo to guitar after moving to Chicago, where he appeared at the 1933 World's Fair with Texas Guinan's Cuban Orchestra. He performed with artists such as Lil Armstrong and Fletcher Henderson, and his career also encompassed sideman, band leader, music arranger and music teacher.

In 1943, the Ink Spots's guitarist Charlie Fuqua was drafted and replaced by Bernie Mackey. When Mackey departed in 1945, leader Bill Kenny offered Long the position. Long stayed with the Ink Spots for nine months until October 1945 when Fuqua returned from the Army. Long moved to New York City, where he taught music. In the 1960s he joined Ink Spots tribute groups.

He retired to Houston, where his daughter set up a museum commemorating him and the Ink Spots. Long died in Houston, Texas at the age of 105 on June 10, 2009.

References

External links
Ink Spot Museum

1904 births
2009 deaths
20th-century American guitarists
African-American banjoists
African-American centenarians
American male guitarists
Guitarists from Chicago
Guitarists from Louisiana
Guitarists from New York City
Guitarists from Texas
Men centenarians
American music educators
Musicians from Houston
People from Sealy, Texas
Singers from Chicago
Singers from Louisiana
Singers from New York City
Singers from Texas
African-American guitarists
20th-century African-American male singers